In Your Dreams may refer to:

Music
 In Your Dreams (Leon Russell album), 2008
 In Your Dreams (Stevie Nicks album) or the title song, 2011
 In Your Dreams, an EP by Say Anything, 2001
 In Your Dreams, a 2006 musical written by Zeke Farrow, with music by Lucian Piane

Other uses
 In Your Dreams (novel), a 2004 novel by Tom Holt
 In Your Dreams (TV series), a 2013 Australian children's drama series
 In Your Dreams, a British film of 2008
 In Your Dreams, a Hong Kong film of 2018
 "In Your Dreams" (Johnny Bravo), a 2000 episode of Johnny Bravo

See also 
 In Dreams (disambiguation)
 In My Dreams (disambiguation)